Norman B. Krim (1913–2011) was an American electronics engineer and engineering executive. His drive to create a transistor product for the electronics experimenter-hobbyist market contributed to paving the path for a generation of American electronics engineers and technicians during the Space Race between the United States and the Soviet Union.

"The result was that a whole generation of aspiring engineers — kids, really, working in their garages and basements — got to make all kinds of electronic projects. A lot of them went on to become engineers." — Harry Goldstein,  editor for IEEE Spectrum magazine.

Early years 
Norm Krim was born June 3, 1913 Manhattan, New York, one of four children of parents Abraham and Ida Krim. He graduated from George Washington High School at age 16 then attended Massachusetts Institute of Technology (MIT) where he graduated 1934 in electrical engineering.  He worked for most of his career for Raytheon, (over 75 years).

He began as an engineer at Raytheon when he was hired in 1933 during his junior year at MIT for 50 cents an hour. His first success was in the development of subminiature tubes, in the Special Tubes group. While working in the special tube division, before the outbreak of WW2, he wanted to use subminiature tubes in consumer products (hearing aids and radios). After Raytheon's success in subminiature tubes for wartime applications such as the proximity fuze, Raytheon became the leader in the design and production of subminiature tubes.  Raytheon promoted Krim to be head of the Special Tube Division. The proximity fuze was a small radar-like device attached to on a bomb or artillery shell that would detonate the bomb or shell before impact, causing a greater destruction.  Just as importantly, the fuze initiated detonation *without* needing to impact the target directly, or to rely on an altitude setting in the fuze that would detonate the shell at an estimated target height, and close enough that the shrapnel cloud would impact the target. Given the extremes of aircraft target range and speed, and of shell accuracy of the day, the proximity fuze dramatically increased the effectiveness of anti-aircraft fire. After World War Two ended, Norman Krim got the go ahead from Laurence Marshall head of Raytheon, to build the first pocket portable tube radio using and adapting subminiature tubes for commercial products. The radio was called the Belmont Boulevard designed by Niles Gowell (Raytheon had acquired Belmont Radio Corp for this purpose).

Raytheon Semiconductor Products 
Although the Belmont Boulevard did not sell well, he later was given another challenge by Laurence Marshall the head of Raytheon to start making semiconductor products. Under his direction Raytheon became a leader in making hearing aid transistors. A Time article in 1953 stated, "This little device, a single speck of germanium, is smaller than a paper clip and works perfectly at one-tenth the power needed by the smallest vacuum tube. Today, much of Raytheon’s transistor output goes to America's hearing aid industry." The hearing aid was first mass-produced consumer electronics to be miniaturized. By 1948 Raytheon had 98% of the hearing aid tube market. Because of the invention transistor by Bell Labs in 1948, Raytheon, under Krim's direction started making transistors for hearing aids. Their first transistor product was the CK703 point contact transistor. His successes in Raytheon's Semiconductor Products allowed him to become Vice President of Receiving, Cathode Ray Tubes and Semiconductor Division.

He is particularly known for developing the first mass-production alloy junction transistor and used the fallouts or transistors that did not meet specifications as transistors to be sold at a much lower cost, the CK721 and CK722. Raytheon quickly moved into alloy junction transistor because of the lower noise, more rugged and lend itself to mass production, compared to point contact transistor. Establishing a tradition that would become a distinctive feature of early transistors, these (CK722) were production drop-outs from another transistor line, the CK721, that did not pass test criteria for the CK718 hearing aid transistor (the main product). However they could be sold at a much lower cost as a lower specification product. This concept help start a new market for transistors, the experimenter and hobby line. Seeing this window of opportunity Krim linked up with Radio Shack to market the hobby grade transistors. Other manufacturers followed soon after.

Early- Before 1956  
 CK718 hearing aid transistor PASS ALL TEST sell to hearing aid companies 
DID NOT MEET ALL KEY PARAMETERS retest as CK721 and CK722
 HAS highest gain and lowest noise label as CK721 sell as audio amplifier
lower gain and higher noise label as CK722 sell as hobby/experimenter

Later as transistor yield improved and size got smaller- After 1956
 CK78X series (CK781 thru CK789) mini hearing aid transistor PASS ALL TESTS sell to hearing aid companies
DID NOT MEET ALL KEY PARAMETERS retest as CK721 and CK722
HAS highest gain and lowest noise put mini transistor into larger case label CK721
lower gain and higher noise  put mini transistor into larger case label CK722

In the later runs Raytheon kept the bigger transistor case size for the CK721 and CK722. A possible reason was marketing. The size was like an identifying physical trademark. Many people who used these transistor still remembered what they looked like.

Transistor radios 
Although Regency is credited of building and marketing the first Transistor Radio (Model TR-1 in 1954), Raytheon was only a few months behind with the 8TP1 through 4 "lunchbox" style radio. Norman Krim was involved in the early transistor radio designs. According to Krim, at the Chapel St labs, they made a six transistor superheterodyne radio in 1952-53. Transistor radio designs for mass production went to Belmont Radio Corporation headed by Henry F. Argento a division of Raytheon. More info on Belmont go to this link Belmont-Raytheon.

Unlike Regency (IDEA Inc), Raytheon used their own transistors. Regency contracted with Texas Instruments, a young upcoming semiconductor manufacturer. According to Consumer Reports Magazine articles dated April and July 1955, the Raytheon was a better radio (used 7 transistors vs 4 in the Regency), but quite a bit larger.  Raytheon marketed only four models (8TP series, T-100 series, T-150 series and T-2500) and got out of the transistor radio market after 1956. More information can be found at this link "Oral History: Norman Krim 1984".

Later career and retirement 

Norman Krim was married to the former Beatrice Barron (deceased in 1994) for 52 years. They had three children Robert, Arthur and Donald.

For a brief time he left his VP position at Raytheon and served as CEO of Radio Shack from 1961-1963. He sold his interests to the Tandy Corporation in 1962. He returned to Raytheon until his retirement in 1997. During those years he was also part of a consulting firm. In later years he would act as Raytheon's in-house historian. Norman Krim was a senior member of the Institute of Electrical and Electronics Engineers or IEEE. He died in December 2011, in Newton, MA at the age of 98.

Engineering contribution to society 
According to Jack Ward's Semiconductor Museum, Norman Krim is credited with inspiring the transistor hobbyist and experimenter market with the creation of the CK721 and CK722. As Jack Ward, curator of the Semiconductor Museum website, states:
 
From the CK722 came articles in electronics magazines, and books and pamphlets on do-it-yourself building projects, as well as competition, notably General Electric who, following Krim's lead of recycling out-of-specification transistors, came up with the 2N107 transistor.

References

External links
 Jack Ward, curator of the Semiconductor Museum and Website interviewed Norman Krim in 2000, a few years after he retired. This interview goes over his career and some of his achievements to engineering and electronics business at Raytheon. Go to this link to listen- Interview with Norman Krim.
 CK722 history at: The CK722 Museum, by Jack Ward.
 Obituary New York Times Norm Krim.
 Details of Raytheon's first mass-produced transistor radio: Model 8TP1
 Excerpt from Michael Brian Schiffer's "The Portable Radio In American Life", regarding the conception and outcome of the world's first mass-produced portable pocket the Belmont Boulevard: Belmont Model 5P113

American electronics engineers
History of radio
1913 births
2011 deaths